Astroblepus chotae is a species of catfish of the family Astroblepidae. It can be found on Colombia and Venezuela.

References

Bibliography
Eschmeyer, William N., ed. 1998. Catalog of Fishes. Special Publication of the Center for Biodiversity Research and Information, num. 1, vol. 1–3. California Academy of Sciences. San Francisco, California, United States. 2905. .

Astroblepus
Fish described in 1904
Catfish of South America
Freshwater fish of Colombia
Fish of Venezuela
Taxa named by Charles Tate Regan